The 1985 ICF Canoe Slalom World Championships were held between 12 and 16 June 1985 in Augsburg, West Germany under the auspices of International Canoe Federation for the second time. Augsburg hosted the event previously in 1957. It was the 19th edition. It also marked the first time the championships took place on an artificial whitewater slalom course at the Eiskanal and the first to be held at an Olympic venue. The Eiskanal previously hosted the slalom canoeing events at the 1972 Summer Olympics held in neighboring Munich.

Medal summary

Men's

Canoe

Kayak

Women's

Kayak

Medals table

References
Official results
International Canoe Federation

Icf Canoe Slalom World Championships, 1985
ICF Canoe Slalom World Championships
Canoe
Icf Canoe Slalom World Championships, 1985
1985 in Bavaria
Canoeing and kayaking competitions in Germany
Sports competitions in Bavaria
June 1985 sports events in Europe